The NHL's Adams Division was formed in 1974 as part of the Prince of Wales Conference. The division existed for 19 seasons until 1993. It was named in honour of Charles Francis Adams, the founder of the Boston Bruins. It is the forerunner of the NHL's Northeast Division, which later became the Atlantic Division.

Division lineups

1974–1976
 Boston Bruins
 Buffalo Sabres
 California Golden Seals
 Toronto Maple Leafs

Changes from the 1973–74 season
 The Adams Division is formed as a result of NHL realignment
 The Boston Bruins, Buffalo Sabres, and Toronto Maple Leafs come from the East Division
 The California Golden Seals come from the West Division

1976–1978
 Boston Bruins
 Buffalo Sabres
 Cleveland Barons
 Toronto Maple Leafs

Changes from the 1975–76 season
 The California Golden Seals moved to Richfield, Ohio, to become the Cleveland Barons

1978–1979
 Boston Bruins
 Buffalo Sabres
 Minnesota North Stars
 Toronto Maple Leafs

Changes from the 1977–78 season
 The Cleveland Barons merge with the Minnesota North Stars. The merged franchise continues as the Minnesota North Stars, but leaves the Smythe Division to assume the Barons' place in the Adams Division to prevent the Adams from dropping to only three teams.

1979–1981
 Boston Bruins
 Buffalo Sabres
 Minnesota North Stars
 Quebec Nordiques
 Toronto Maple Leafs

Changes from the 1978–79 season
 The Quebec Nordiques are granted entry into the NHL from the World Hockey Association (WHA)

1981–1992
 Boston Bruins
 Buffalo Sabres
 Hartford Whalers
 Montreal Canadiens
 Quebec Nordiques

Changes from the 1980–81 season
 The Minnesota North Stars and Toronto Maple Leafs move to the Norris Division
 The Hartford Whalers and Montreal Canadiens come from the Norris Division

1992–1993
 Boston Bruins
 Buffalo Sabres
 Hartford Whalers
 Montreal Canadiens
 Ottawa Senators
 Quebec Nordiques

Changes from the 1991–92 season
 The Ottawa Senators are added as an expansion team

After the 1992–93 season
The league was reformatted into two conferences with two divisions each:
 Eastern Conference
 Atlantic Division
 Northeast Division
 Western Conference
 Central Division
 Pacific Division

Regular season Division champions
 1975 – Buffalo Sabres (49–16–15, 113 pts)
 1976 – Boston Bruins (48–15–17, 113 pts)
 1977 – Boston Bruins (49–23–8, 106 pts)
 1978 – Boston Bruins (51–18–11, 113 pts)
 1979 – Boston Bruins (43–23–14, 100 pts)
 1980 – Buffalo Sabres (47–17–16, 110 pts)
 1981 – Buffalo Sabres (39–20–21, 99 pts)
 1982 – Montreal Canadiens (46–17–17, 109 pts)
 1983 – Boston Bruins (50–20–10, 110 pts)
 1984 – Boston Bruins (49–25–6, 104 pts)
 1985 – Montreal Canadiens (41–27–12, 94 pts)
 1986 – Quebec Nordiques (43–31–6, 92 pts)
 1987 – Hartford Whalers (43–30–7, 93 pts)
 1988 – Montreal Canadiens (45–22–13, 103 pts)
 1989 – Montreal Canadiens (53–18–9, 115 pts)
 1990 – Boston Bruins (46–25–9, 101 pts)
 1991 – Boston Bruins (44–24–12, 100 pts)
 1992 – Montreal Canadiens (41–28–11, 93 pts)
 1993 – Boston Bruins (51–26–7, 109 pts)

Season results

Playoff Division champions
 1982 – Quebec Nordiques
 1983 – Boston Bruins 
 1984 – Montreal Canadiens
 1985 – Quebec Nordiques
 1986 – Montreal Canadiens
 1987 – Montreal Canadiens
 1988 – Boston Bruins
 1989 – Montreal Canadiens
 1990 – Boston Bruins
 1991 – Boston Bruins
 1992 – Boston Bruins
 1993 – Montreal Canadiens

Stanley Cup winners produced
 1986 – Montreal Canadiens
 1993 – Montreal Canadiens

Presidents' Trophy winners produced
 1990 – Boston Bruins

Adams Division titles won by team

References
 NHL History

National Hockey League divisions